This is a list of electoral district results for the 1995 New South Wales state election for members of the Assembly.

Results by Electoral district

Albury

Ashfield

Auburn

Badgerys Creek

Ballina

Bankstown

Barwon

Bathurst

Baulkham Hills

Bega

Blacktown

Bligh

Blue Mountains

Broken Hill

Bulli

Burrinjuck

Cabramatta

Camden

Campbelltown

Canterbury

Cessnock

Charlestown

Clarence

Coffs Harbour

Coogee

Cronulla

Davidson

Drummoyne

Dubbo

East Hills

Eastwood

Ermington

Fairfield

Georges River

Gladesville

Gordon

Gosford

Granville

Hawkesbury

Heffron

Hurstville

Illawarra

Keira

Kiama

Kogarah

Ku-ring-gai

Lachlan

Lake Macquarie

Lakemba

Lane Cove

Lismore

Liverpool

Londonderry

Maitland

Manly

Maroubra

Marrickville

Miranda

Monaro

Moorebank

Mount Druitt

Murray

Murrumbidgee

Murwillumbah

Myall Lakes

Newcastle

North Shore

Northcott

Northern Tablelands

Orange

Oxley

Parramatta

Peats

Penrith

Pittwater

Port Jackson

Port Macquarie

Port Stephens

Riverstone

Rockdale

St Marys

Smithfield

South Coast 

The sitting member John Hatton did not contest the election.

Southern Highlands

Strathfield

Sutherland

Swansea

Tamworth

The Entrance

The Hills

Upper Hunter

Vaucluse

Wagga Wagga

Wakehurst

Wallsend

Waratah

Willoughby

Wollongong

Wyong

See also 

 Results of the 1995 New South Wales state election (Legislative Council)
 Candidates of the 1995 New South Wales state election
 Members of the New South Wales Legislative Assembly, 1995–1999

Notes

References 

1995 Legislative Assembly